Ray Whitaker was an Australian rules footballer for the Port Adelaide Football Club.

References

Port Adelaide Football Club (SANFL) players
Port Adelaide Football Club players (all competitions)
Living people
Year of birth missing (living people)
Australian rules footballers from South Australia